Fernando Luís Iglesias Sánchez (August 25, 1909 – May 14, 1991), known as Fernando Iglesias or "Tacholas", was a Spanish-Argentine actor from Ourense. He starred in the 1962 film Una Jaula no tiene secretos.

Notes

References

External links
 
 

Spanish male film actors
Argentine male film actors
1909 births
1991 deaths
People from Ourense
20th-century Argentine male actors
Male actors from Galicia (Spain)
20th-century Spanish male actors
Spanish emigrants to Argentina